Campylacantha olivacea, known generally as the fuzzy olive-green grasshopper or olive grasshopper, is a species of spur-throated grasshopper in the family Acrididae. It is found in North America.

Subspecies
These three subspecies belong to the species Campylacantha olivacea:
 Campylacantha olivacea olivacea (Scudder, 1875) i c g b (fuzzy olive-green grasshopper)
 Campylacantha olivacea similis Scudder & S.H., 1897 c g
 Campylacantha olivacea vivax (Scudder & S.H., 1876) c g b
Data sources: i = ITIS, c = Catalogue of Life, g = GBIF, b = Bugguide.net

References

External links

 

Melanoplinae
Articles created by Qbugbot
Insects described in 1875